Alfred Wayne Malone (born February 21, 1982) is a former American football defensive tackle. He was signed by the Houston Texans as an undrafted free agent in 2005. He played college football at Troy.

Malone has also played for the Green Bay Packers and Las Vegas Locomotives.

Early years
Malone attended Frisco City High School where he played defensive end and tight end.

College career
Malone started his college career at Georgia Tech before transferring to Troy. During his college time he recorded 50 sacks.

External links
Just Sports Stats
Georgia Tech Yellow Jackets bio
Green Bay Packers bio

1982 births
Living people
People from Monroe County, Alabama
American football defensive tackles
American football defensive ends
Georgia Tech Yellow Jackets football players
Troy Trojans football players
Houston Texans players
Green Bay Packers players
Las Vegas Locomotives players